Taylor Townsend was the defending champion, but chose not to participate as she is on maternity leave.

Mayar Sherif won the title, defeating Katarzyna Kawa in the final, 6–2, 6–3.

Seeds

Draw

Finals

Top half

Bottom half

References

Main Draw

LTP Charleston Pro Tennis - Singles